"Kiss Kiss" is a song by American singer Chris Brown featuring vocals and sole production from fellow American singer and rapper T-Pain from the former's second studio album, Exclusive (2007). Written by the two artists, the song was released as the album's second single on September 10, 2007 worldwide. It was later solicited to rhythm crossover radios in the United States on September 11, 2007. "Kiss Kiss" is composed as upbeat chanting record that incorporates elements of R&B and dance music. The song is written mainly about getting a woman's attention.

The official remix features American rapper Nelly from the hip-hop group St. Lunatics.

"Kiss Kiss" topped the charts in New Zealand and the United States, becoming Brown's second number one single in both countries. It also peaked inside the top ten in Canada and Australia and later earned platinum certifications there. The single, however failed to garner similar success in the European territories, peaking outside the top twenty in Ireland and the United Kingdom and below the top fifty in Sweden and Switzerland.

The music video for "Kiss Kiss" was directed by Brown and Erik White, who directed the music video for his last number one single "Run It!". The video features Brown in personas – a nerd and a jock – and several dance sequeces. It earned a nomination at the 2008 MTV Video Music Awards for "Best Choreography". It was nominated for several other accolades at the 2008 BET Awards and the 50th Annual Grammy Awards.

Background and production

"Kiss Kiss" was released as the second single from Brown's second studio album Exclusive (2007), after the moderately successful "Wall to Wall" (2007). The song was released to digital retailers worldwide on September 10, 2007, through Zomba Recordings. A day later, on September 11, 2007, Jive Records and Zomba Recordings serviced the song to rhythmic crossover radio in the United States. It was later solicited to contemporary hit radio on October 16, 2007.

"Kiss Kiss" was written by Chris Brown and T-Pain, and produced by the latter. In an interview with Shaheem Reed from MTV News, Brown stated that the first version, which he intended to make a little more adult, was rejected. He said the original line, " She's chunky, chunky/ She's thick, thick" was changed to "She wants that lovey dovey/ That kiss, kiss/ In her mind, she fantasize about getting with me/ 'Cause they hating on me/ They wanna dis, dis, but she's fine, so fine/ And thick as can be" to keep the song "PG-13".  The song was recorded at Chalice Recording Studio – a recording studio in Los Angeles, California – by Brian Sumner. Fabian Marasciullo mixed the track with assistance from Chad Jolley at Hit Factory Criteria in Miami, Florida. A remix featuring Nelly in addition to T-Pain was released in November 7.

Composition
"Kiss Kiss" has been described as an upbeat dance track with a bouncy drum beat. According to the music sheet published at Musicnotes.com by Universal Music Publishing Group, the song utilizes styles of urban and R&B music and has a moderate hip-hop tempo of 140 beats per minute. It is written in a key of E♭ minor while Brown's vocals range from B4 to B5. Brown's vocals are Auto-Tuned on some parts. Brown, in an interview with MTV News, called it "a real chanting record". Lyrically, "Kiss Kiss" is written about getting with another woman. Nick Levine of Digital Spy said the song was "big on bragging", citing the lyric "I got paper girl, the Lamborghini - with the spider seats, you never seen it" as an example.

Music video
The music video for "Kiss Kiss" was shot at Florida International University's University Park campus, in Miami, Florida. This video premiered on BET's 106 & Park on August 30, 2007. The music video is also available on iTunes. This song was voted #1 on MTV's 27 Essential R&B Songs of 2007.

The song had its debut on VH1 at #6 on January 5. In the video Brown plays two different versions of himself, a nerd and a jock, both trying to get the attention of a pretty girl who also attends the college. The jock side of Brown is constantly picking on the nerdy Brown around the girl, thinking it will impress her, whereas the nerdy Brown is always being nice to her. In one scene of the video the jock Brown is playing football in a field by the school, while the nerdy Brown is attempting to talk to the girl. The jock Brown seeing this runs and tackles the nerdy Brown to the ground. At the end of the video the two Browns are standing in front of their cars in the parking lot.  The girl comes up, passes the jock Brown and kisses the nerdy Brown and proceeds to get in his vehicle, while the jock looks on, bewildered. K. Michelle made a cameo in the video. The music video received a nomination at the 2008 MTV Video Music Awards for "Best Choreography", but lost to Gnarls Barkley's "Run".

Critical reception

Mark Edward Nero, a writer for the same publication, praised the song as a "fun, infectuous [sic] collaboration" but cited T-Pain's "elementary school-level" rap verses as its weak point. Nero, however, accredited T-Pain as a good producer, in reference to the song. Erinn V. Westbrook of The Harvard Crimson expressed approval of the song, asking the question "Who can resist a bouncy beat–or Nappy Boy, for that matter?" Andy Kellman of Allmusic named it one of the album's highlights, commenting that Brown could get away with the lyric "And I get a little mannish, and you see the bandanna hangin'/That means I'm like a bandit." Jorge Castillo of Yale Daily News called the song catchy and wrote that it was the epitome of Exclusive'''s "star-studded supporting cast of performers and producers". Nick Levine of Digital Spy gave the song a two star rating, calling it a "fairly lacklustre late-noughties R&B track" and commenting that "It's safe to presume he saves his best chat-up lines for Rihanna."

Accolades
"Kiss Kiss" received a nomination for Best Rap/Sung Collaboration at the 50th Grammy Awards, held at the Staples Center in Los Angeles, California on February 10, 2008. It lost to Rihanna's 2007 single Umbrella. At the 2008 BET Awards, "Kiss Kiss" got a nomination for Best Collaboration, but lost to Kanye West's 2007 song "Good Life". The song was also nominated for Viewer's Choice, but lost to Lil Wayne's 2008 single "Lollipop". The song is listed number three on the 100 Best Songs of 2007, published by the music magazine Rolling Stone.

Chart performance
"Kiss Kiss" debuted at number 100 on the US Billboard Hot 100 in the issue dated September 29, 2007. In the song's sixth week on the chart, it ascended to number two, rising from number 22, following a surge in digital downloads, totaling 159,000 for that week. One week later, in the issue dated November 10, 2007, "Kiss Kiss" topped the Billboard Hot 100 while earning the biggest airplay and digital sales gainer and ending the seven-week streak held by Soulja Boy's "Crank That (Soulja Boy)". The song remained atop the Hot 100 for three consecutive weeks and earned the airplay gainer title during that period. The song also peaked at number two on the US Radio Songs and at number four on the US Pop Songs charts. As of April 2014, the single has sold 3,117,000 copies in the US. On August 23, 2019, the single was certified quadruple platinum by the Recording Industry Association of America (RIAA) for sales of over four million copies in the United States.

In Canada, "Kiss Kiss" entered the Canadian Hot 100 at number 70 in the issue dated November 3, 2007. Eight weeks later, the song peaked at number six. On April 21, 2008, it was certified double platinum by Music Canada for selling 80,000 ringtones.

"Kiss Kiss" debuted on the Australian Singles Chart at number 36 on the issue dated November 25, 2007. The song slowly ascended the chart for fifteen weeks until the issue dated March 9, 2008, when it peaked at number eight. "Kiss Kiss" was later certified platinum by the Australian Recording Industry Association (ARIA) for shipping 70,000 copies. In New Zealand, the song entered the singles chart at number twenty on the issue dated September 24, 2007. In the following week, the song rose to number four, earning the greatest gainer title. It rose to number one in the next week, where it remained for three weeks. The song was certified platinum on December 16, 2007 by the Recording Industry Association of New Zealand (RIANZ). "Kiss Kiss" debuted on the UK Singles Chart at number 40 in the issue dated November 3, 2007. Two weeks later, the song rose to number 38. It left the singles chart after seventeen weeks.

Personnel
 Chris Brown – songwriting, vocals
 T-Pain – songwriting, production, vocals
 Brian Sumner – recording engineer
 Fabian Marasciullo – mix engineer
 Chad Jolley – assistant mix engineer
 Herb Powers, Jr. – mastering engineer
 Recorded at Chalice Recording Studios in Los Angeles, California
 Mixed at Hit Factory Criteria in Miami, Florida.
Credits adapted from Exclusive'' liner notes, Jive Records, Zomba Recording.

Charts

Weekly charts

Year-end charts

Decade-end charts

Certifications

See also
List of Hot 100 number-one singles of 2007 (U.S.)
List of Billboard Rhythmic number-one songs of the 2000s
List of number-one singles from the 2000s (New Zealand)

Radio and release history

References

External links
 Chris Brown's official site

Songs about kissing
2007 singles
2007 songs
Chris Brown songs
T-Pain songs
Songs written by Chris Brown
Songs written by T-Pain
Song recordings produced by T-Pain
Music videos directed by Erik White
Jive Records singles
Billboard Hot 100 number-one singles
Number-one singles in New Zealand